Īśvarism has been alleged to be one of the religious streams in Hinduism along with other streams such as Brahmanism, Jainism, Buddhism and Lokayata.

See also

References

Hindu denominations